Mahakal Institute of Technology (commonly known as MIT, Ujjain) is an institution of the Mahakal Group of Institutes near the village of Karchha, Behind Air Strip, Datana about 20 km from Ujjain, Madhya Pradesh India. It was founded in 2001 and offers courses in a variety of engineering disciplines, including Civil Engineering, Electrical Engineering, Electronic Engineering, Mechanical Engineering, Computer Engineering and Diploma in Accounting. Engineering degrees are affiliated with Rajiv Gandhi Proudyogiki Vishwavidyalaya in Bhopal. Commerce and Accounting courses are online courses and college of commerce is considered as private college.

History
The idea of building an institute in Ujjain was conceived by Prasar Shikshan Evam Seva Sansthan (PSSS) with the aim to transform young talent into competent and socially responsible professionals with a global vision. Mahakal Institute of Technology (MIT Ujjain) was inaugurated by the then Hon’ble Chief Minister of Madhya Pradesh Mr. Digvijay Singh on 26 July 2001.

In the academic session of 2001-02 MIT, Ujjain began with just 220 students and few faculty members in the varied streams. The institute then had only four branches of Engineering: Electronics and Telecommunication, Computer Science, Information Technology and Electrical and Electronics. Mahakal Group of Commerce offers some online courses in finance and accounting.

References

External links
 Official website

Universities and colleges in Madhya Pradesh
Education in Ujjain
Buildings and structures in Ujjain
2001 establishments in Madhya Pradesh
Educational institutions established in 2001